Henry Thompson (born 1 December 1992) is an English cricketer. He is a right-handed batsman and a right-arm off break bowler. He made his first-class debut for Leeds/Bradford MCCU against Yorkshire on 5 April 2013.

References

External links

1992 births
Living people
Cricketers from Preston, Lancashire
English cricketers
Leeds/Bradford MCCU cricketers